Diplocyclos is a genus of climbing or trailing vine in the family Cucurbitaceae. The genus comprises four or five species. D. palmatus is pantropical in distribution and the remainder of species are restricted to Africa. All species are found within rainforest and the moister woodland types.

Diployclos is characterised by simple, palmately lobed leaves and dioecius flowers, with male and female flowers in axillary sessile clusters or racemes. Diplocylos produce fleshy, globular fruit with distinct striped or spotted patterns. All parts of the plant are toxic in large quantities, however the leaves are eaten in small quantities as a vegetable in some parts of the world. The leaves and fruits are also used for medicinal purposes.

Species
 Diplocyclos decipiens
 Diplocyclos leiocarpus
 Diplocyclos palmatus
 Diplocyclos schliebenii
 Diplocyclos tenuis

Sources 

 http://plantnet.rbgsyd.nsw.gov.au/cgi-bin/NSWfl.pl?page=nswfl&lvl=gn&name=Diplocyclos
 http://www.theplantlist.org/browse/A/Cucurbitaceae/Diplocyclos/
 https://books.google.com/books?id=6jrlyOPfr24C&pg=PA289
 http://www.biomedcentral.com/content/pdf/1471-2148-11-28.pdf

Cucurbitaceae genera
Cucurbitoideae